Aretas is the Greek form of a name borne by kings of the Nabataeans resident at Petra It can refer to:

Aretas I was a king in the time of Antiochus IV Epiphanes
Aretas II ruled Nabatea from 120 or 110 to 96 BC
Aretas III ruled Nabatea from 87 to 62 BC
Aretas IV Philopatris was the father-in-law of Herod Antipas; he is described as ruler of Damascus at the time of Paul's conversion
Aretas (martyr) (died 523)

See also 
Arethas (disambiguation)
Haritha (disambiguation)